Jasika Nicole Pruitt (born April 10, 1980), is an American actress and illustrator from Birmingham, Alabama. She is known for her role as Agent Astrid Farnsworth on the Fox series Fringe. She has guest-starred in Scandal as Kim Munoz. She starred as Carly Lever, the head of pathology, in the ABC medical drama The Good Doctor.

Career
Nicole studied theatre, dance, voice and studio art at Catawba College in Salisbury, North Carolina.

In 2017, she voiced a femme "brown-skinned energetic creative" named Reina, for the Amazon Video animated series Danger & Eggs, who likes to build with her hands, is empowered by the world around her, and is the best friend of one of the protagonists.

She is currently the voice of Dana Cardinal on the podcast Welcome to Night Vale. She also plays Keisha, the protagonist and narrator on Alice Isn't Dead, a podcast by WTNV co-writer Joseph Fink.

Personal life
Nicole is biracial, and has said that while growing up, there were very few TV characters with whom she could identify. Nicole is lesbian. She was featured in the 2010 OUT 100 list in Out, and was photographed alongside Bruno Tonioli, Armistead Maupin, and Bill Silva for the issue. She married her long-time partner, CJ Savage, on October 5, 2013.

Nicole also designs and makes all of her own clothes, including shoes, pants, jackets, and undergarments.

Filmography

Film

Television

Other media

References

External links

Official site

Interview at WickedInfo.com

1980 births
American lesbian actresses
Actresses from Birmingham, Alabama
LGBT African Americans
Catawba College alumni
Living people
Artists from Birmingham, Alabama
American television actresses
African-American actresses
American film actresses
LGBT people from Alabama
21st-century African-American women
20th-century African-American people
21st-century American actresses
20th-century African-American women